Yoann Fréget (whose stage name is Yoann FreeJay since 2016) is a French singer, and the winner of the French edition of the world-famous TV show: The Voice (The Voice: la plus belle voix), as part of Team Garou.

He auditioned for the show singing Whitney Houston's 'The Greatest Love of All' with all four judges (Florent Pagny, Jenifer, Louis Bertignac and Garou) turning their chairs, along with a standing ovation from television studio's public. FreeJay (then 'Fréget') opted to be on Garou's team. His audition was aired on the third episode on 16 February 2013.

On 18 May 2013, he won the final of the competition, against Olympe (Team Jenifer), Nuno Resende (Team Florent Pagny), and Loïs Silvin (Team Louis Bertignac).

He is also the winner of the largest French Soul music competition, 'Sankofa Soul Contest', which he won on 24 June 2011, at Le Cabaret Sauvage (Paris).

Since May 2016, Yoann is living between New York City and Paris, as he obtained the US Visa of 'Artist with Extraordinary Abilities' for 3 years.

He is currently preparing his second album, writing and composing all its songs, entirely in English.

Biography
Yoann FreeJay (Fréget), singer of extraordinary warmth, talent, grace and musical diversity, has been a dedicated vocalist since his early childhood. His father, Eric Fréget, singer, keyboardist, writer & composer, was his first inspiration, while his mother, Emmanuelle Fréget, photographer, used to do backing vocals on his father's songs ...

Yoann's musical career started as early as the age of 15, soon after he discovered Gospel music through a concert of the well-known choir 'Gospelize It! Mass Choir', directed by Emmanuel Pi Djob; one of the most famous Gospel music pioneer in France, originally from Cameroon. This concert was a deeply transformative musical and spiritual experience for Yoann.

Only a few months after, Yoann succeeded the audition to integrate the professional ensemble of nearly 100 singers, and quickly became not only one of the very few soloists of the choir, but also the younger one, giving a stirring rendition of 'Amazing Grace' at every concert and touring France with the group for more than 3 years.

Through this unique experience, Yoann benefited of an intense initiation to Gospel music by Emmanuel Pi Djob and was deeply impregnated by the inherent search for freedom and peace that comes along with this music, which never ceased to be one of Yoann's stronger musical influences.

Early Promise 
By the age of 18, Yoann began touring as lead singer for various popular gospel, soul, and rhythm & blues bands around France, such as BRBB (Otis Redding Tribute Band), The Soul Travelers Gospel Quartet, Gospel Shakers and Gospel Jam. He also created his own band at the time, along with a tribute for Stevie Wonder.

Later on, Yoann appeared as soloist in the most famous European gospel choir, 'Gospel Pour 100 Voix' ('The 100 Voices of Gospel'). His talent was nurtured and enhanced through collaboration with excellent American gospel singers, such as Malik Young, Linda Lee Hopkins, Francine Ealey Murphy, and Tori Robinson. While associated with 'Gospel Pour 100 Voix', he performed on some of the most prestigious stages in Europe, including all the Zéniths, Paris-Bercy Arena, and Brussel's Cirque Royal in Belgium.

The Healing Power of Music 
In 2008 and at the age of 21, Yoann graduated as a Music Therapist from the University of Montpellier. While there, he worked extensively with autistic children, as well as teenagers with stuttered speech syndrome (SSS). In the latter case, Yoann was teaching from experience, as he himself has been affected by severe stuttering disorder from the age of 3 to 19 years old. He totally overcame SSS through the practice of music and meditation.

That same year, Yoann also started to conduct his own gospel choir, 'Le Choeur Enchanté' and to give singing workshops all over Europe (England, Germany, Italy, Belgium, Sweden, Austria, etc ... ).

Travels to India & First Tour in North America 
In 2010, Yoann made a life-changing journey of five months to India, in order to deepen his knowledge of music therapy and Indian classical music. He came back renewed and musically transformed by this unique experience in total immersion in the Indian culture.

A few months after, Yoann was invited for his first solo tour in Canada, and USA. During 3 months, he performed more than 50 concerts in various cities and toured US from New York to Los Angeles. He inaugurated a personal performance style which featured concerts entirely a cappella, emphasizing on the unique beauty and moving expressiveness of his voice. This enabled him to present his music to a whole new audience and captivate new listeners, and to sing, for the first time of his career, as guest in the black community churches, where his performances were overwhelmingly well-received, and where he truly felt home. After this first US tour, Yoann's desire to live in America was born.

Victory of 'The Sankofa Soul Contest' 
When he returned to France in 2011, Yoann won first place in France's largest Soul music competition 'The Sankofa Soul Contest', while singing two songs by one of his musical heroes, Stevie Wonder. Yoann's contest prize was to travel back to the US and have the great opportunity to perform, with Erykah Badu's musicians backing him up. This concert was specially tailored for him in Dallas, Texas. Yoann also used that great tour experience to travel to New Orleans, where he was invited by his friend and New Orleans native, Craig Adams, a popular American Gospel organist and singer. Craig invited Yoann to sing as guest in many influential churches of New Orleans, accompanied by him on keys. These new experiences gave to Yoann inspiring and powerful immersions into the African American culture and music, with the common ground of an incredibly good reception from his Gospel and Soul music raised peers whenever he performed.

Yoann has also had the honor to perform as a background singer for outstanding artists such as Stevie Wonder, Liz McComb, Nicole Slack Jones, Helen Carter, and Marianne Aya Omac.

Winning first place of 'The Voice' TV show 
In 2013, Yoann won the world-famous TV show 'The Voice' in France. With an incredible rendition of 'The Greatest Love of All', receiving a standing ovation from the studio audience at the middle of the song, Yoann was selected by all four judges to be part of their respective teams. The judges were astonished to discover such a singer in France.

With more than 7 million viewers each week - and 10 million during the final show - during 5 months of airing, Yoann won over the hearts of millions of people. During his journey on 'The Voice', he covered some of the greatest standards of vocal music, from Pop ('Earth Song'/ Michael Jackson; 'Vole'/ Celine Dion; 'Calling You'/ Jevetta Steele) to Soul ('Man's World'/ James Brown; 'Can You Feel It?'/Jackson 5; 'Free'/ Stevie Wonder) to Gospel music ('Amazing Grace' / in duet with his coach Garou).

He did so with extraordinary vocal agility, dexterity, and a humble spirit that endeared him to audiences throughout Europe.

First Album in French, Soundtrack of 'Beauty & The Beast', and more... 
On 6 January 2014, his first album with Universal Music France, 'Quelques Heures Avec Moi', was released. This record emphasized great melodies with deep and yet accessible lyrics by famous writers like François Welgryn (Celine Dion, Garou, etc.) and Jacques Veneruso (Celine Dion, Johnny Hallyday, Tina Arena, etc.), his amazing vocal abilities, and a great crossover of French pop and American soul music. One of the songs on the album, 'Sauras-tu m'aimer?' was specially chosen as the worldwide soundtrack for the biggest movie of the year in France (36 million $ budget), 'Beauty and The Beast', directed by Christophe Gans (with Vincent Cassel & Lea Seydoux as first roles). The movie garnered the number one movie spot in most countries where it has been aired, and allowed Yoann's music to reach a broader international audience.

On this same year, Yoann was invited by the international pop singer Lara Fabian (30 million records sold worldwide) to record a duet ('On Se Retrouvera') on the album 'Les Enfants du Top 50', which met great reception of the French public when performed live on French TV channel M6.

Yoann was also invited to perform for the opening act of WILL.I.AM's concert in Paris-Bercy Arena.

After his victory of The Voice, Yoann sang and appeared on numerous TV shows (Vivement Dimanche, La Parenthèse Innatendue, etc.), newspapers and radios.

He has been performing ever since for sold-out shows under his own name in France and abroad (Mauritius, Canada, Belgium, Switzerland, Nigeria, etc ... ), as he has been invited as well to sing with renowned French artists as Nicoletta, or Vladimir Cosma, and for numerous humanitarian galas and fundraising charity events (Eva Longoria's Global Gift Gala, Restos du Coeur Belgique, Les Femmes Dynamisantes de Clarins, Tout le Monde Chante Contre le Cancer, Les Petits Princes, Arthritis, Leurs Voix pour l'Espoir, etc.).

Second Album In Progress between France & USA 
In May 2016, Yoann obtained the US Visa of 'Artist with Extraordinary Abilities' for 3 years, and has been living between New York City and Paris.

Since then, Yoann has been performing in US in front of crowds of thousands for prestigious venues: renowned churches services (Donnie McClurkin's PFC, Hezekiah Walker LFC, Harlem Kelly's Temple, Pleasant Grove, etc ...), Gospel music conventions (LAS VEGAS Thomas A. Dorsey's 2017 GMC, James Cleveland's 2017 GMWA), and global events as the Annual Holliday Tree Lighting at Manhattan's Washington Square Park, or the NYC Couture Fashion Week at the renowned Crowne Plaza Times Square Manhattan.

On 2 December 2016, Yoann gave his first NYC's sold-out solo concert at one of the most mythical place for Soul Music in Manhattan: 'The Ashford & Simpson's Sugar Bar'. He did so under the gracious attention of the legendary Valerie Simpson (composer of 'Ain't No Mountain High Enough', 'I'm Every Woman', 'You're All I Need To Get Bye', etc.) along with the mentorship of his Godmother, the worldwide acclaimed film director Euzhan Palcy (A Dry White Season, Ruby Bridges, etc.).

Presently, Yoann is preparing his second album, which has been announced to be: "out-of-the-little-boxes", "mixing all his musical influences with complete artistic freedom", "entirely written in English" by Yoann himself, and "co-composed with multi-talented musicians". His fans are eagerly awaiting for this new album as its making has been advertised at the occasion of his last TV appearances, interviews and concerts.

Discography

Albums

Singles

Soundtrack
 2014: "Sauras-tu m'aimer" – from "Beauty & The Beast" - biggest movie budget of 2014 in France - directed by Christophe Gans; starring Vincent Cassel as the Beast & Léa Seydoux as Beauty.

References

External links
 Official website

The Voice (franchise) winners
Living people
French Christians
1989 births
21st-century French singers
21st-century French male singers